Nosale  is a village in the administrative district of Gmina Bralin, within Kępno County, Greater Poland Voivodeship, in west-central Poland.

The village has a population of 200.

References

Nosale